Sivanesan a/l Shanmugam (born 28 December 1990) is a Malaysian footballer who plays for Malaysian club Melawati in Malaysia M3 League. Sivanesan mainly plays as a forward but also can play as an attacking midfielder.

Club career

PKNS
On 29 December 2016, Sivanesan signed a contract with Malaysia Super League club PKNS. He made his debut for the club in 1–3 defeat over Kelantan on 27 January 2017.

Melaka United
On 12 June 2017, during second window transfer, Sivanesan signed a contract with Melaka United for an undisclosed fee. On 22 July 2017, he made his league first appearances for Melaka United in a 0–2 defeat over Pahang at Darul Makmur Stadium.

Career statistics

Club

References

External links
 Profile at Arena.my
 

1990 births
Living people
Malaysian footballers
Sportspeople from Kuala Lumpur
Negeri Sembilan FA players
Felda United F.C. players
Malaysian people of Tamil descent
Malaysian sportspeople of Indian descent
Malaysia Super League players
Association football midfielders
Association football forwards
Melaka United F.C. players